Longchuansmilus is an extinct genus of saber-toothed cats of the tribe Machairodontini that lived in China during the Late Miocene.

Etymology 
The generic name "Longchuansmilus" is derived from the Longchuan River, which runs along the Yuanmou Basin, and σμίλη (smilē), dagger. The specific name honours Xingyong Zhang, who has helped greatly in the discovery and study of the fossils at the Yuanmou hominid site.

Palaeoecology 
Longchuansmilus would have coexisted with proboscideans, the beaver Sinocastor, the rodent Kowalskia, the flying squirrel Pliopetaurista, the rabbit Alilepus, and the ape Lufengpithecus. Animals found near the fossil include tapirs, insectivores, flying squirrels, bamboo rats, freshwater birds, fish, frogs, turtles, crocodiles, beavers, otters and terrestrial birds, all which point to a swampy or lacustrine environment.

References 

Machairodontinae
Fossil taxa described in 2022
Fossils of China